Thomas Preljubović was ruler of the Despotate of Epirus in Ioannina from 1366 to his death on December 23, 1384. He also held the title of Albanian-slayer (Greek: Αλβανοκτόνος/Αλβανιτόκτονος) after torturing Albanian prisoners in order to terrify his enemies.

Thomas is remembered for presenting several outstanding icons to the monastery of the Transfiguration at Meteora and in Cuena, in Spain. He also made gifts to the Athonite monasteries of Great Lavra, Vatopedi and Hilandar. Preljubović was particularly attached to his namesake the apostle Thomas. In one of the icons at Meteora, a composition of Doubting Thomas includes Thomas' wife, Maria-Angelina, among the apostles. It is possible that he was responsible for having the frescoes painted in the Hilandar parekklesion of the Holy Archangels, where in the lower zone, the apostle Thomas and the warrior St. Procopius occupy a prominent place.

Ancestors
Thomas was the son of caesar Gregorios Preljub, the Serbian governor of Thessaly, who died in late 1355 or early 1356. His mother Irene Nemanjić was a daughter of Stephen Uroš IV Dušan of Serbia and Helena of Bulgaria.

Life
After the violent death of his father, Thomas' claim to Thessaly was asserted by his mother Irene, but they were forced to flee to Serbia by the advance of Nikephoros II Orsini in 1356. Here, Irene married Radoslav Hlapen, the ruler of Vodena, who took Thomas under his wing.

During the absence of Thessaly's new ruler, Simeon Uroš Palaiologos, in the Despotate of Epirus in 1359–1360, Hlapen invaded Thessaly, attempting to win it for his stepson. Although Simeon Uroš managed to contain the invasion, he was forced to cede Kastoria to Thomas and to marry him to his daughter Maria.  Over the next several years, Simeon Uroš recognized that he could not assert effective authority over most of Epirus and delegated power in Arta and Angelokastron to local Albanian chieftains. In 1366 the citizens of Ioannina, the last major fortress to remain under Simeon Uroš's control, sent him a petition to appoint a governor who could protect them from the raids of Albanian clansmen.

Simeon Uroš responded by designating Thomas as his governor and forwarding the Ioanninan and Vagenetian (Thesprotian) embassy to him.  Thomas entered Ioannina sometime in 1366 or 1367.  Thomas' reign in Epirus is reflected in most detail in the so-called Chronicle of Ioannina, which is deeply prejudiced and hostile against Preljubović. It represents him as a cruel and capricious tyrant.  Thomas seized various properties of the Church of Ioannina and awarded them to his Serbian retainers.  In 1382 a new appointee to the local archbishopric, Matthew, was sent out from Constantinople, and invested Thomas with the title of despotes on behalf of the Byzantine Emperor John V Palaiologos.  Nevertheless, later Thomas quarreled with the archbishop and exiled him from Ioannina.

Thomas was also accused of persecuting the local nobility, which  inspired a series of revolts against his rule. In addition to seizing ecclesiastical and private property, Thomas established new taxes and monopolies on various commodities, including fish and fruit.  In addition to relying on his military forces to enforce these imposts, Thomas waged a continuous war against the Albanians of Arta and Angelokastron.

Soon after taking possession of Ioannina, Thomas was unsuccessfully besieged by Albanian nobleman, Peter Losha of Arta. Thomas betrothed his daughter to Losha's son in 1370, satisfying the Albanians and ending conflicts. In 1374, Pjetër Losha died of the plague in Arta, after which Gjon Shpata took over the city. At this time he was not bound by agreement to Thomas; he laid siege to Ioannina and ravaged the country-side. Thomas brought peace when he betrothed his sister Helena to Gjon Shpata the following year. Attacks on Ioannina continued, however, by the Malakasioi, who were finally defeated by Thomas (1377 and 1379). In May 1379, Gjon Shpata devastated the country-side of Ioannina.

After repeated failure, Thomas turned for help to his Frankish and then his Ottoman neighbors.  The latter responded promptly and dispatched an auxiliary force in 1381.  Thomas put this force to good use and conquered many fortresses from his enemies in 1381–1384.  He was given the epithet "Albanian-Slayer" (Αλβανοκτόνος, Albanoktonos). However, the Albanians under Gjon Shpata, together with the Mazarakii tribe held their defensive positions and ultimately defeated Thomas once again.

Nevertheless, Thomas had come to be on bad terms with his wife Maria, who participated in the subsequent conspiracy against her husband.  On December 23, 1384, Thomas was assassinated by his guards. the population of Ioannina swore allegiance to Maria and invited her brother John Uroš Doukas Palaiologos to come and advise her in the government.

Assessment 
Preljubović is generally treated in a negative outlook in contemporary sources. The Chronicle of Ioannina, written about his rule in Ioannina, regularly describes him as "wicked", a "merciless sadist" and a "murderer". In the Chronicle, Preljubović is described as "greedy and avaricious" and special mention is made to his tyrannical actions towards the church, the nobility and regular citizens of Ioannina.

Issue

By Tsarevna Princess Jerina (daughter of Tsar Dusan), Thomas II Preljubović had at least one daughter:
 Irene, who married Gjon Bua Shpata, and died in 1374–5.
By his wife Maria Angelina Doukaina Palaiologina Thomas II possibly had a son:
 Preljub (Prealoupes), who must have died young.

References

Bibliography
 
 
 
 
 

1384 deaths
14th-century Serbian nobility
14th-century Byzantine people
14th-century despots of Epirus
Assassinated Byzantine people
Year of birth unknown
14th-century rulers in Europe
Medieval Ioannina
Boyars of Stefan Dušan